World War III (Der Dritte Weltkrieg) is a 1998 German alternate history television pseudo-documentary, directed by Robert Stone and distributed by ZDF. An English version was also made, which aired on TLC in May 1999. It depicts what might have transpired if, following the overthrow of Mikhail Gorbachev, Soviet troops, under orders from a new hard-line regime, had opened fire on demonstrators in Berlin in the fall of 1989 and precipitated World War III. The film mixes real footage of world leaders and archive footage of (for example) combat exercises and news events,  with newly shot footage of citizens, soldiers, and political staff.

Plot
The movie opens with clips of the US Armed Forces scrambling to respond to a Soviet nuclear attack. Daniel Schorr, reporting in front of the White House, is vaporized when a nuclear weapon detonates.

In the summer of 1989, East Germany is in turmoil. Many citizens are dissatisfied with their nation’s Communist leadership and seek reunification with West Germany. On October 7, Mikhail Gorbachev, a supporter of those reforms, visits East Berlin. During his return flight, the hard-line Communist leadership stages a coup that deposes Gorbachev and installs (fictional) General Vladimir Soshkin as the new Soviet leader. The Soviet government announces that Gorbachev resigned for "reasons of ill health," but Gorbachev is never heard from again, his true fate "lost in the darkness of history."

Soshkin and the hard-liners fiercely resist the rise of glasnost and perestroika. They are determined to end the uprisings in East Germany and the rest of the Eastern Bloc with a swift Chinese-style military crackdown in late October. (In East Germany at least, the crackdown is not limited to demonstrators; numerous moderate Communists such as Egon Krenz and Günter Schabowski are "disappeared", never to be heard from again.) The crackdown inflames popular opposition to communism. In late November, a demonstration in Leipzig is brutally repressed by the East German Army at great loss of life. Two days later, a demonstration at the Brandenburg Gate ends with East German soldiers killing many East Berlin residents trying to scale the Berlin Wall and a West German cameraman filming the events. Those soldiers also fire shots over the wall into West Berlin. Soon after, the East German government responds to the international condemnation of their conduct by ordering all foreign journalists out of the country.

In mid-December, NATO airlifts military reinforcements to West Berlin. Soon after, Secretary of State James Baker arrives in West Berlin to secretly meet with General Dmitry Leonov, the Soviet commander in East Germany, who strongly opposes Soshkin's crackdown. However, on the way to the meeting, Leonov is killed by a car bomb, for which a West German neo-Nazi group claims responsibility. After an interview with West German TV in which Soshkin implicitly threatens West Berlin, an American colonel orders that tactical nuclear weapons in West Germany be placed on high alert. Soshkin responds with new threats, a massive deployment of the Soviet submarine fleet, and incursions of Soviet Bear bombers into Alaskan airspace.

On January 25, 1990, several East German and Soviet tank divisions are mobilized to cut off transportation and supply links between West Germany and West Berlin, and the Soviet Air Force moves to close off East Germany's airspace. Soshkin hopes the plan will prevent the West from encroaching into the Soviet sphere of influence and isolate Berlin from the West. NATO responds by deploying thousands of additional troops into West Germany to strengthen their existing garrisons there.

As the United States prepares their first military convoy across the North Atlantic, the Soviets announce their intention to blockade the U.S. Navy transports. Soshkin desires to cut off Western Europe and weaken the NATO buildup. The US and Britain condemn the blockade and last-minute attempts at a compromise fall through. When the convoy crosses into the designated exclusion zone, Soviet forces are ordered to attack. Nearly a quarter of the convoy is sunk in the ensuing battle before the NATO fleet clears the air and sea lanes to Europe. Shortly afterward, the United Nations Security Council holds an emergency session in New York City in the hopes of diffusing the hostilities between the superpowers, but the United States and Soviet Union both refuse to back down until the other does so. World War III has effectively begun.

The world panics after the failed session and the United States dispatches (fictional) National Security Advisor Martin Jacobs to the Soviet Union for last-ditch effort talks with Soshkin. Figuring that Soshkin knows that the Soviets are losing power in Eastern Europe, Jacobs offers Soshkin an extended timetable for the Soviet withdrawal from Eastern Europe in exchange for a de-escalation of the military buildup. Soshkin refuses him utterly with one word: "Nyet" (no).

The battle for Germany

On March 12, Soshkin orders a massive amphibious landing near Kiel on the Baltic coast, carried out by the Volksmarine and the Soviet Navy's Baltic Fleet. The landings catch NATO off-guard, and they scramble forces northward to push back the beachhead. The next day, Warsaw Pact ground forces drive through the Fulda Gap, with orders to push to the Rhine to divide the stretched-out NATO armies. To support the assault, the Soviet Air Force bombards targets immediately on the Baltic coast and NATO bases further inland, such as Ramstein Air Base. The overall plan is to cripple the NATO buildup with a swift strike and then press for a new round of diplomatic bargaining from a stronger strategic position. NATO forces, surprised by an enemy that far outnumbers them, are pushed back, though they inflict substantial losses on the Warsaw Pact forces, who lose well over 1,000 dead in the first 24 hours. By March 17, the Warsaw Pact forces have advanced 50 miles into West Germany. Entire towns are destroyed in the fighting as increasingly desperate NATO commanders try to stall the Warsaw Pact's advance, and civilian and military casualties are heavy, overwhelming NATO medical personnel. Public order collapses amid the mass panic, and 20 million automobiles jam the roads as West German civilians try to flee.

While preparing to launch a tactical nuclear counter-assault, NATO carries out a last-ditch conventional air campaign––code-named Operation Bloody Nose––launched 24 hours before the nuclear strikes were to begin. The already-overworked NATO aviators are given just one day to turn the tide of an entire war. Thanks in part to a daring raid on the Soviet Army's forward headquarters in Poland and the use of American stealth aircraft, Bloody Nose is an overwhelming success: the initial strikes cripple Warsaw Pact command and control posts, throwing their armies in the field into chaos. In the ensuing air battle, NATO also inflicts devastating losses on the Soviet Air Force (which had already lost 20% of the aircraft supporting the initial offensives), thereby gaining air supremacy over Eastern European airspace. Combined with assistance from the Polish underground that cuts off Soviet supply lines, the tide of the war turns. With their numerical superiority negated by Western technological superiority, the East German and Soviet armies melt under NATO airstrikes, and counterattacking NATO forces cross into East Germany on March 23.

Global thermonuclear war
NATO forces reach and liberate West Berlin on March 27. Now in full retreat, the Soviet Army withdraws to Poland, abandoning the East Germans to fend for themselves. With the East German military beaten, its central government falling apart, and foreign armies rapidly advancing into the country, East Germany essentially collapses, leaving many Germans on both sides of the Iron Curtain to hope that reunification is at hand. With victory close, the American leadership tries to reassure Soshkin that NATO has no intention of pressing their advance beyond East Germany. Open revolt erupts across the Eastern Bloc as citizens of the communist nations, as well ethnic minorities within the Soviet Union, press for the overthrow of their own leaders, emboldened by the collapse of East Germany and the fact that the Soviets are obviously losing the war. Soshkin's paranoia and desperation rise swiftly as the entire Eastern Bloc falls apart around him, and while NATO has no intention of actually doing so, Soshkin quickly becomes convinced that they will try to exploit the situation and fight all the way to Moscow.

As a show of force, on March 31 Soshkin orders a symbolic nuclear strike above the North Sea. The United States responds by going to full nuclear alert and preparing to execute the Single Integrated Operational Plan. On April 1 (ironically April Fools Day), a Soviet radar post suffers an equipment malfunction. Falsely believing that the USSR is under nuclear attack, Soshkin orders an all-out retaliatory nuclear strike against the West. The nuclear powers of NATO have no choice but to respond in kind, and thousands of nuclear devices are launched across the Northern Hemisphere. The narrator intones, "There is no further historical record of what happens next," suggesting that civilization was either wiped out or destroyed to such a great extent, that overall post-war human survival -- much less, the reconstruction of civilization -- would be rendered all but impossible.

Epilogue
The movie then rewinds to Gorbachev’s visit to East Germany. Archival footage is shown of the celebrations of the fall of the Berlin Wall and the peaceful reunification of Germany, before finally ending with the credits roll.

Characters

Actors playing fictional characters

Clips of real life political leaders

Differences between German and English versions
The German version is preceded by a disclaimer clarifying that the events of the film are based on actual contingency plans of various governments (the filmmakers consulted numerous military experts on both sides, and received access to previously classified NATO and Warsaw Pact war plans), but that, "Thankfully for us all", the situations they were created for never happened.
The news broadcasts which make up a significant part of the film are different: the German version, as a ZDF production, uses that network and its on-air personalities for the segments, while the English version shows various reporters working for an unnamed American network (for the opening scene, the English version shows Daniel Schorr's full report, while the German one has a ZDF report before switching to Schorr for the nuclear explosion).
Similarly, in the German version, Senator Gramm's statements on the coup are replaced by those of Schleswig-Holstein Governor Björn Engholm, leader of the opposition SPD at that time.
In the English version, other languages are subtitled (except for a Gorbachev speech about perestroika); in the German version, other languages are translated (except for field interviews with US Army officers once the shooting starts).
The two West German characters, Gen. Frohm and Dr. Bruckner speak in German in the ZDF version and English for TLC.
The English version contains two scenes not included in the German one: an interview with two East German soldiers who escaped to the West during the Brandenburg Gate massacre, and a pair of "man on the street" interviews (one bellicose, delivered with the accent and demeanor of a stereotypical New Yorker, the other nervous but optimistic) in Times Square.
The English version mentions West German, British, Dutch, and American soldiers meeting the initial Baltic attack; in the German version, Belgian forces take part as well.
In the German version, the decisive NATO air assault is named "Operation Bloody Nose"; in English, it is never given a name.
The rewound montages between the missile-launch "ending" and the celebratory images of the actual events are slightly different.
While the German version concludes with scenes from both the events of November 1989 and reunification (along with the "different course" line), the English narration has no such coda, and the montage is entirely from the fall of the Wall.

Parallels and references to real-life events
Prague Spring/Invasion of Czechoslovakia—General Soshkin had participated in the 1968 crackdown; the brutality of the forces under his command was so notorious that he appeared on the cover of  Life magazine.
Stanislav Petrov prevented the start of nuclear war during a time of increased US/Soviet tension when a Soviet radar computer malfunctioned in November 1983.
Black Monday of 1987—Images of the alarming headlines it generated for the New York Post ("CRASH!") and Daily News ("PANIC!") were used to illustrate a Wall Street crash caused by uncertainty over the future.
Tiananmen Square protests of 1989—Chinese students hold a pro-democracy protest near the seat of the Chinese government. After weeks of demonstrations, the Chinese military forcibly ended the protest. This is likely the "Chinese solution" alluded to by Soshkin. The events of the movie are set four months after the crackdown. In reality, Honecker openly desired to deal with the unrest in this manner (to the point of trying to talk Gorbachev into such crackdowns in Poland and Hungary), even issuing a written order to do so in Leipzig, and was ousted in mid-October largely to prevent them from being carried out.
The fall of the Berlin Wall and the reunification of Germany—Clips from both also appeared out of context: footage of the reunification was used to show celebrations following the liberation of West Berlin, to suggest it happened after the November massacre.
The Soviet coup attempt of 1991 against Mikhail Gorbachev—Clips of US officials and "West German" Chancellor Helmut Kohl discussing this event were used in this film; since the coup occurred after 1990, Kohl was actually speaking as the leader of a unified Germany when he made these statements.
 The Persian Gulf War of 1990–91—Clips of US officials discussing this war were used in this film. FLIR video footage of Coalition air attacks on Iraq is used to illustrate the attack on Warsaw Pact headquarters. News footage of the Allied airstrikes on Baghdad at the start of Operation Desert Storm is used to illustrate the bombing of Hamburg by Soviet and East German air forces. 
 The Falklands War of 1982. Footage from the Battle of San Carlos and the Bluff Cove Air Attacks is used to illustrate the naval battle.
 The Bosnian War of 1992–95. Shots from aircraft cameras were used to illustrate the NATO bombing of Legnica.
 The Vietnam War. Footage of the US Marines at Khe Sanh under attack from North Vietnamese Army artillery is used to illustrate the Soviet and East German airstrikes on Ramstein Air Base in West Germany.
 The First Chechen War. Footage of Russian troops in the Battle of Grozny is used to illustrate Soviet forces retreating from West Germany back into East Germany. Footage of Chechen rebels fighting Russian troops is also used to illustrate the collapse of the East German government as well as to illustrate the growing armed resistance inside the Soviet Union to Soshkin's regime.
 The Soviet–Afghan War. Footage of Soviet troops is used to illustrate Soviet forces retreating to Poland.
 George H.W. Bush's statements "We're dealing with Hitler revisited" and possibly "our hearts go out to the hostages" refer to Saddam Hussein's invasion of Kuwait, not Soshkin.
MiG 29 pilot ejecting at extremely low altitude. He is not shot down, he was performing aerobatics at the 1989 Paris Air Show at Le Bourget Airport when his engine flamed out.

References

External links
 

1990s war films
1998 films
1998 television films
Films about World War III
Films about nuclear war and weapons
Films directed by Robert Stone
Films set in 1989
German alternate history films
German television films
German war films
1990s German-language films
German-language television shows
Political mockumentaries
Films about coups d'état
Films set in East Germany
Films about communism
Films set in the Soviet Union
Films set in the White House
Films about the United Nations
Films about the United States Armed Forces
Films set in West Germany
Films set in Berlin
Films set in Poland
Films about political repression
1990s American films
1990s German films
ZDF original programming
Cultural depictions of Mikhail Gorbachev
Cultural depictions of George H. W. Bush
Cultural depictions of Margaret Thatcher